Gediminas Bridge is a bridge in Kupiškis, Lithuania. The bridge crosses the Kupa River. It is one of eight bridges in Kupiškis. The bridge is named after the street that crosses the bridge. Gediminas (c. 1275–1341) was Grand Duke of Lithuania from 1315 or 1316 until his death.

Road bridges in Lithuania
Pedestrian bridges in Lithuania
Buildings and structures in Panevėžys County